A slow dance is a type of partner dance in which a couple dance slowly.

Slow Dance or Slow Dancing may also refer to:

Albums
 Slow Dance (Anthony Phillips album), 1990
 Slow Dance (Jeremy Jay album), 2009
 Slow Dance (Southside Johnny album), 1988
 Slow Dancing (EP), a 2014 EP by Betty Who
 Slow Dance, a 2002 album by Ken Navarro
 Slow Dance, a 2019 EP by AJ Mitchell
 Slow Dancing, a 1997 album by Tommy Tune

Songs
 "Slow Dance" (song), a 2009 song by Keri Hilson
 "Slow Dance" (Hey Mr. DJ), a 1992 song by R. Kelly and Public Announcement
 "Slow Dancing" (Aly & AJ song), 2020
 "Swayin' to the Music (Slow Dancing), first released in 1976 as "Slow Dancing"

 "Slow Dance", a song by from the 1946 album Frank Sinatra Conducts the Music of Alec Wilder
 "Slow Dance", a song by Carpenters from the 1989 album Lovelines
 "Slow Dance", a song by Laurence Juber from the 1990 album Solo Flight
 "Slow Dance", a song by Michael Peterson from the 1999 album Being Human
 "Slow Dance", a song by Motörhead from the 2000 album We Are Motörhead
 "Slow Dance", a song by Chris Rea from the 2002 album Dancing Down the Stony Road
 "Slow Dance", a song by Senses Fail from the 2004 album Let It Enfold You
 "Slow Dance", a song by Bring Me the Horizon from the 2006 album Count Your Blessings
 "Slow Dance", a song by from the 2007 album The Moment
 "Slow Dance", a song by Starfucker from the 2011 album Reptilians
 "Slow Dance", a song by Kelly Clarkson from the 2017 album Meaning of Life
 "Slow Dance", a 2019 song by AJ Mitchell and Ava Max from Mitchell's EP of the same name
 "Slow Dancing", a song by Lindsey Buckingham from the 1984 album Go Insane
 "Slow Dancing", a song by Bono from the 1993 album Stay (Faraway, So Close!)
 "Slow Dancing", a song by Lucero from the 2002 album Tennessee